Georges Gourdy (born 11 October 1905, date of death unknown) was a French boxer. He competed in the 1924 Summer Olympics. In 1924, Gourdy was eliminated in the second round of the flyweight class after losing his fight to Rinaldo Castellenghi.

References

External links

1905 births
Year of death missing
Sportspeople from Bordeaux
Flyweight boxers
Olympic boxers of France
Boxers at the 1924 Summer Olympics
French male boxers